Amir Jabbar Hinton (born February 14, 1997) is an American-born naturalized Syrian professional basketball player for Kouvot of the Finnish Korisliiga. He also plays for the Syria men's national basketball team. Hinton played college basketball for Shaw University and Lock Haven University.

Early life and High school
Hinton was born and raised in Philadelphia, Pennsylvania and attended Abington Senior High School in the suburb of Abington. He did not play basketball as a freshman and played sparingly on the Galloping Ghosts' junior varsity team as a sophomore before starting his final two years. He scored over 1,000 career points at Abington, despite only playing two seasons, and averaged 19.5 points per game and was a second team AAAA All-State selection as a senior.

College career

Lock Haven
Hinton began his collegiate career at Lock Haven, playing two seasons for the Bald Eagles after redshirting as a freshman due to academics. He averaged 23 points per game both seasons and led the Pennsylvania State Athletic Conference (PSAC) with 2.4 steals per game as a redshirt sophomore, earning first team All-PSAC East honors and was named the PSAC East Freshman of the Year during his redshirt freshman season. Despite his success, Hinton opted to transfer after his redshirt sophomore season. He was the fastest player in PSAC history to reach 1,000 career points and finished his career at Lock Haven with 1,227.

Shaw
Hinton ultimately transferred to Shaw University, in large part due to former NBA player and Shaw standout, Flip Murray's Philadelphia connections. In his first season with the Bears, he averaged an NCAA Division II-leading 29.4 points per game and was named the Central Intercollegiate Athletic Association (CIAA) Player of the Year. Considered to be a rare Division II NBA prospect, Hinton announced on March 7, 2019 that he would be forgoing his final year of eligibility to enter the 2019 NBA draft. In his only season with Shaw Hinton scored 853 points and finished his collegiate career with 2,080 points in 81 games played (25.7 points per game).

Professional career
Hinton went unselected in the 2019 NBA Draft and reportedly signed an Exhibit 10 contract with the New York Knicks as an undrafted free agent later that night. Hinton officially signed with the Knicks on September 17, 2019, but was waived on October 16. Following his release, he joined the Knicks' NBA G League affiliate, the Westchester Knicks, as an affiliate player. On November 11 against the Lakeland Magic, Hinton posted 24 points, five rebounds, and two steals. He finished the season averaging 7.9 points, 1.9 rebounds, and 1.0 steal per game.

On August 30, 2021, Hinton signed with Kouvot of the Finnish Korisliiga.

National team career 
Hinton joined the Syria men's national basketball team in 2021 as a naturalised player for the 2023 FIBA Basketball World Cup qualification. On February 24, 2022, he recorded 36 points, 7 rebounds and 5 assists in a 80–64 win over Bahrain.

References

External links
 Lock Haven Bald Eagles bio
 Shaw Bears bio
 RealGM profile

1997 births
Living people
American men's basketball players
Basketball players from Philadelphia
Lock Haven Bald Eagles men's basketball players
Point guards
Shaw Bears men's basketball players
Westchester Knicks players
American expatriate basketball people in Finland
Kouvot players
Syrian men's basketball players